Ledra was an ancient city kingdom in Cyprus.

Ledra may also refer to:
Ledra, a genus of leafhoppers
Ledra Street, a road in Nicosia
The Ledra Palace hotel in Nicosia.